William C. Robinson (September 24, 1884 – March 11, 1916) was an early American inventor and aviator.

Biography
Robinson was born in Redfield, South Dakota, and moved to Grinnell, Iowa in 1896 at age 12. He was a handyman, tinkerer, and bicycle repairman who designed and built his own flying machine. In 1911, with the help of Charles Hink, Robinson constructed a 60 horsepower radial motor for his monoplane. His innovations for the radial motor were revolutionary. In 1914 he set a record for non-stop flight, carrying mail from Des Moines to Kentland, Indiana. Later he founded the Grinnell Aeroplane Company.

Robinson perished while flying his biplane, attempting to set an altitude record on March 11, 1916. His aircraft was witnessed climbing to altitude, before drifting down like a falling leaf, and gliding to a landing, which was controlled enough to leave skid marks, but rough enough to rupture the fuel tank and ignite the aircraft. Hypoxia was suspected among other reasons for the crash, but the fire made it impossible to verify the exact cause.

On June 18, 1988, the Grinnell Regional Airport was dedicated and named Billy Robinson Field.

References

Archives
Additional photos of Robinson and his planes can be found in Digital Grinnell, a digital archive of Grinnell local history materials maintained by Grinnell College.

External links
Billy's entry in the Earlyaviators.com
Photographic history of Robinson's aviation accomplishments included in the Iowa Heritage Digital Collection.
Billy Robinson: Birdman of the Prairie by Lynn Cavanagh, in Iowa Heritage Illustrated, Summer 2014.
The Story of Billy Robinson, from Grinnell- A Century of Progress, a centennial publication published by the Grinnell Herald-Register, July, 1954.
Birdman of the Prairie: The life and death of Iowa Aviator Billy Robinson 10 minute documentary created for the National History Day Documentary contest

1884 births
1916 deaths
Aviators from South Dakota
Aviators killed in aviation accidents or incidents in the United States
People from Redfield, South Dakota
People from Grinnell, Iowa
Accidental deaths in Iowa
American aviation record holders